Hope FM is an  English and iTaukei language Christian, radio station in Fiji. The station broadcasts on the 107 MHz to the cities of Suva, Navua,  Nausori, Nadi and Lautoka. The station also broadcasts on line.

It is operated by Seventh Day Adventist Church, Fiji.

References

English-language radio stations
Radio stations in Fiji
Christian Radio in Fiji
Christian radio